Lil' Chief Records is a New Zealand–based indie pop record label formed in 2002.  Operating from the Auckland suburb of Mt. Eden, it was founded on releases by The Tokey Tones and The Brunettes. The label's roster now includes a collective of pop artists such as Jonathan Bree, Princess Chelsea, The Ruby Suns, and Edmund Cake.

History

Founding
Lil' Chief Records was founded in New Zealand by indie pop musicians Scott Mannion and Jonathan Bree in 2002. The two men had met that year in Marbecks Record Store in Auckland, where Bree was working at the time. They discovered they were both bedroom recording artists who shared a number of influences. Likewise, both were having difficulty finishing their respective albums and finding a label, particularly since the trend in New Zealand at the time was towards guitar-based rock bands.

They decided to form their own label  to focus on "100% orchestrated pop music from the New Zealand music scene," citing Factory Records, Flying Nun, and Creation Records as inspiration. Lawrence Mikkelsen, a friend of Mannion's and an early supporter of the label, volunteered as the label's "post master general" and archivist.

Initial releases

The label's first release was the debut LP of Bree's band The Brunettes. Released October 2002, Holding Hands, Feeding Ducks was a joint release with EMI New Zealand. The album received a glowing review from Allmusic, as did the label's second release, The Brunette's 2003 The Boyracer EP. Bree produced both albums.

The label soon set up its headquarters in the Auckland flat of Gareth Shute, a local writer and musician who had befriended Scott Mannion. Dubbed 'The Ghetto,' the large flat's rooms and graffiti-lined garage became a regular rehearsal space, as well as a recording studio for many of the label's future releases. As of 2013, it continues to be the location of operations.

The next two albums on the label were released simultaneously in 2003. Caterpillar and Butterfly by The Tokey Tones both featured and were produced by label founder Scott Mannion. Members of The Brunettes guested on some of the tracks, and when playing live The Tokey Tones have since relied on a revolving cast of musicians from other Lil' Chief Records bands, such as The Brunettes and The Ruby Suns. The New Zealand Herald stated "There has been nothing quite so tasteful, fully realized or confident in Kiwi pop," about the releases.

Later that year indie pop band The Nudie Suits released their album Songbook on the label. Frontman Mark Lyons was both Bree's cousin and had been a mentor in Bree's formative years.

Development

In 2004, the band The Ruby Suns was formed when Ryan McPhun moved to Auckland from California and started playing in The Brunettes and The Tokey Tones.

In 2005 Edmund Cake released his solo album Downtown Puff on the label, which was followed by Shaft's debut LP Open Sesame  and releases by Alec Bathgate and The Ruby Suns. The label's community of musicians also formed a cover band called Disciples of Macca, which focused on solo Paul McCartney and Wings material.

Also in 2005 the label released  Now We Are Three!!!, its first compilation, which featured tracks pulled from its previous catalogue. The compilation was positively received with a review stating "Lil Chief Records is a label to keep on eye on." A second compilation, Greetings From New Zealand, followed in 2007.

By 2006 the roster had expanded to include artists such as Lawrence Arabia and his band The Reduction Agents, Shugo Tokumaru, and the band Voom. Radio New Zealand did a feature on the label in August 2006, when Andrew Clifford visited their Auckland headquarters.

In 2008 the label was written up in the UK's Sunday Times in the article ”New Zealand, pop Mecca? A new wave of bands is set to expand your horizons”.  Also that year The Ruby Suns were named among the "best new music" in Pitchfork, while Lawrence Arabia toured with Feist.

In May 2012 the label released the compilation These Shaky Isles, with tracks going back ten years in its catalogue. As of 2013 label continues to release indie pop bands, such as the all-girl project The Gladeyes and Princess Chelsea.

Artists
The following artists have released albums through Lil' Chief Records as of March 2019.

Alec Bathgate
Jonathan Bree
The Brunettes
Cool Rainbows
Edmund Cake
The Gladeyes
Lawrence Arabia
Little Pictures
The Nudie Suits
Pie Warmer
Pikachunes
Princess Chelsea
The Reduction Agents
The Ruby Suns
Scott Mannion
Shaft
Sheep, Dog & Wolf
Shugo Tokumaru
The Tokey Tones
Voom
Wet Wings

Discography 
The following list is organized by catalog number, which is a roughly chronological number system established by the label.

References

External links

Lil Chief Records on MySpace
Lil Chief Records on Facebook
Lil Chief Records on YouTube
Radio New Zealand: Visit to Lil Chief Records (August 25, 2006) - 25'12"

New Zealand independent record labels
Record labels established in 2002
Pop record labels
2002 establishments in New Zealand